Dejan Kulusevski  (born 25 April 2000) is a Swedish professional footballer who plays as a winger or midfielder for  club Tottenham Hotspur, on loan from  club Juventus, and the Sweden national team.

Coming through from the youth system, Kulusevski made his senior debut for Atalanta in 2019, before joining Parma on loan at the beginning of the 2019–20 season. He joined Juventus during the winter transfer window for €35 million, and was sent back to Parma on loan for the rest of the season. In January 2022, Kulusevski was sent on loan to Tottenham Hotspur in England.

Kulusevski was born in Sweden to a Swedish Macedonian father and a Macedonian mother. He represented both Macedonia and Sweden internationally at youth level, before opting to play for his birth country at senior level, making his full debut in 2019.

Club career

Early career 
Kulusevski was born in Stockholm and joined the youth activities of IF Brommapojkarna at the age of six.

Atalanta

2018–19 season 
He joined the Atalanta youth system on 7 July 2016 from Brommapojkarna, before making any senior appearance for the club. He made his Serie A debut on 20 January 2019, coming on as a substitute for Marten de Roon in a 5–0 away win against Frosinone. He made a total of three appearances for the club throughout the 2018–19 season, each as a substitute.

Loan to Parma (2019–20) 
On 18 July 2019, Kulusevski signed to Serie A club Parma on loan until 30 June 2020. He scored his first Serie A goal in a 3–2 home win against Torino, on 30 September.

Juventus

Return to Parma (2019–20) 
Following his form while on loan with Parma during the first part of the 2019–20 Serie A season, during which he scored four goals and provided seven assists in 17 league appearances, on 2 January 2020, Kulusevski joined fellow Serie A club Juventus on a four-and-a-half year deal, for €35 million, which could possibly rise to €44 million with variables.

Kulusevski was sent back on loan to Parma for the remainder of the season. He finished the season with 10 goals and nine assists, and was awarded the Serie A Best Young Player for the season.

2020–21 
Kulusevski scored on his Juventus debut on 20 September 2020 in a 3–0 league win at home against Sampdoria. On 19 May 2021, he scored the opening goal and later set-up Federico Chiesa's match-winning goal in a 2–1 victory over Atalanta in the 2021 Coppa Italia Final. In the next season, Kulusevski scored the winning goal in the Champions League match against Zenit Saint Petersburg with a header in the 86th minute on 20 October.  Kulusevski's playing time was reduced under Massimiliano Allegri, making 20 appearances and scoring two goals.

Loan to Tottenham Hotspur 

On 31 January 2022, Kulusevski was sent on an 18-month loan to Premier League side Tottenham Hotspur; the loan deal was worth €10 million, and included an option for purchase, which would become an obligation under certain conditions for an additional fee of €35 million. He made his first appearance for Spurs on 5 February in the FA Cup match against Brighton & Hove Albion, coming on a substitute in a 3–1 win. On 19 February, Kulusevski scored his first goal for Tottenham in the fourth minute of the match which Tottenham eventually won 3–2 against Manchester City. In his first season, Kulusevski managed 13 goal involvements (five goals and eight assists) in 18 Premier League matches.

International career 
Born in Sweden to Macedonian parents from Ohrid, Kulusevski played for all Swedish youth national teams, as well as the Macedonia under-17 national team. He was called up to the Sweden national team for the first time in November 2019 for the UEFA Euro 2020 qualifying games against Romania and the Faroe Islands. For the senior national team, Kulusevski has said that his choice of allegiance was 'an easy one' since it was always his preference to represent Sweden.

Kulusevski made his senior international debut for Sweden on 18 November 2019, coming on as a substitute for Ken Sema in a 3–0 win against the Faroe Islands in the last game of the Euro 2020 qualifying stage. On 8 September 2020, he made his first start for Sweden, playing for 90 minutes before being substituted for Albin Ekdal in a 0–2 loss to Portugal in the 2020–21 UEFA Nations League. On 14 November 2020, Kulusevski scored his first international goal against Croatia in a 2–1 home win in the Nations League.

On 8 June 2021, Kulusevski tested positive for COVID-19 amid its pandemic in Sweden, and was ruled out of Sweden's opening UEFA Euro 2020 match against Spain on 14 June.

Style of play 
A tall, physically strong, and versatile player, Kulusevski is capable of playing in several midfield and attacking roles, and has been deployed as an attacking midfielder, as a box-to-box midfielder, as a winger on either flank, or even as an offensive-minded central midfielder, known as the mezzala role in Italian (literally "half-winger"); his main position is playing as an attacking midfielder behind the striker. He has also been deployed as a makeshift centre-forward on occasion. His main qualities are his acceleration, speed, stamina, and his ability to switch the play or provide assists and through balls to teammates, courtesy of his vision and passing ability. He also possesses good technique, dribbling skills, and striking ability, which enables him to score goals, in addition to creating chances for teammates.

Regarded as a promising and hard-working player in the media, his manager at Parma, Roberto D'Aversa, has compared Kulusevski to Mohamed Salah. He noted how the player "is always among the players who cover the most distance in every game", and "has the right mentality". Kulusevski himself named compatriot Zlatan Ibrahimović as an influence. Regarding his own playing style, he commented in a 2019 interview with Sportbladet: "I like to have the ball at my feet. I used to dribble a lot when I was a kid but I have got better at moving the ball more quickly. I have developed my defensive game, that was a weakness before, and that has made me a more complete player." He has also cited Belgian footballers Kevin De Bruyne and Eden Hazard as players he admires and seeks to emulate.

Career statistics

Club

International

Scores and results list Sweden's goal tally first, score column indicates score after each Kulusevski goal

Honours 
Juventus
 Coppa Italia: 2020–21
 Supercoppa Italiana: 2020

Individual
 Serie A Best Young Player: 2019–20
 Fotbollsgalan Best Midfielder: 2020
Guldbollen: 2022

References

External links

 Profile at the Tottenham Hotspur F.C. website
 
 
 

Living people
2000 births
Footballers from Stockholm
Swedish footballers
Macedonian footballers
Association football midfielders
Association football wingers
IF Brommapojkarna players
Atalanta B.C. players
Parma Calcio 1913 players
Juventus F.C. players
Tottenham Hotspur F.C. players
Serie A players
Premier League players
North Macedonia youth international footballers
Sweden youth international footballers
Sweden under-21 international footballers
Sweden international footballers
UEFA Euro 2020 players
Macedonian expatriate footballers
Swedish expatriate footballers
Expatriate footballers in Italy
Expatriate footballers in England
Macedonian expatriate sportspeople in Italy
Macedonian expatriate sportspeople in England
Swedish expatriate sportspeople in Italy
Swedish expatriate sportspeople in England
Swedish people of Macedonian descent